The International Crane Foundation (ICF) is a non-profit conservation organization that works to conserve cranes and the ecosystems, watersheds, and flyways on which they depend. Founded in 1973, the International Crane Foundation is headquartered in Baraboo, Wisconsin on a 250-acre property that includes live crane exhibits with 15 crane species, a visitor center, breeding facilities, a research library and nature trails. The foundation works worldwide and in the US with local partners to raise and conserve cranes. The Foundation maintains a regional base in China and shares program offices with partner organizations in Cambodia, India, South Africa, Texas, Vietnam, and Zambia. The International Crane Foundation's approximately 80 staff work with a network of hundreds of specialists in over 50 countries on five continents.

History
The International Crane Foundation was founded in 1973 by two ornithology students at Cornell University, Ron Sauey and George W. Archibald, who envisioned an organization that would combine research, captive breeding and reintroduction, landscape restoration, and education to safeguard the world's 15 crane species. In 1973, the Sauey family rented their Horse farm to Ron and George for $1 a year to found the International Crane Foundation in Baraboo, Wisconsin. The organization moved to its current location in 1983.

Archibald was the organization's director from 1973 to 2000. He pioneered several techniques there to rear cranes in captivity, including the use of crane costumes by human handlers. Archibald spent three years with a highly endangered Whooping crane named Tex, acting as a male crane – walking, calling, dancing – to shift her into reproductive condition. Through his dedication and the use of artificial insemination, Tex eventually laid a fertile egg which hatched a chick named Gee Whiz.

The International Crane Foundation's office in Rockport, Texas was demolished in 2017 by Hurricane Harvey, but will be rebuilt. The office was located near the Aransas National Wildlife Refuge, an area that sustains the last naturally occurring flock of whooping cranes.

See also
Aldo Leopold

References

External links

 International Crane Foundation

International environmental organizations
Ornithological organizations in the United States
Protected areas of Sauk County, Wisconsin
Parks in Wisconsin
Education in Wisconsin
Zoos in Wisconsin
Nature centers in Wisconsin
1973 establishments in Wisconsin
Baraboo, Wisconsin
Environmental organizations based in Wisconsin